Kyle Baun (born May 4, 1992) is a former Canadian professional ice hockey forward who was last under contract to the Vienna Capitals of the Erste Bank Eishockey Liga (EBEL). Baun played in the National Hockey League (NHL) with the Chicago Blackhawks and is the grandson of former Toronto Maple Leafs player Bobby Baun.

Playing career
After a Canadian minor junior league career with the Toronto Jr. Canadiens and the Cornwall Colts, Baun opted to pursue a collegiate career in committing with Colgate University of the ECAC conference.

Undrafted and upon completing his junior season in Colgate with 29 points in 38 games, earning an ECAC Third All-Star Team selection, Baun was signed to a two-year entry level contract with the Chicago Blackhawks of the NHL on March 26, 2015. He immediately joined the Blackhawks for the remainder of the 2014–15 season, and later made his NHL debut in a 2-1 defeat to the Minnesota Wild on April 7, 2015.

During the 2015–16 season, on March 3, 2016, while with AHL affiliate, the Rockford IceHogs, Baun agreed to a two-year contract extension with the Blackhawks.

Approaching his third professional season in 2017–18, the Montreal Canadiens acquired Baun from the Blackhawks in exchange for forward Andreas Martinsen on October 4, 2017.  Later in the season, on February 25, 2018, Baun was traded to the Toronto Maple Leafs, along with Tomáš Plekanec, in exchange for Kerby Rychel, Rinat Valiev and a second-round pick in the 2018 NHL Entry Draft.

As a free agent from the Maple Leafs, on August 1, 2018, Baun left North America and agreed to a deal with UK based, EIHL side the Belfast Giants.

After a season with the Vienna Capitals of the Austrian Hockey League (EBEL), Baun retired from hockey.

Career statistics

Awards and honours

References

External links
 

1992 births
Living people
Belfast Giants players
Canadian ice hockey forwards
Chicago Blackhawks players
Colgate Raiders men's ice hockey players
Laval Rocket players
Rockford IceHogs (AHL) players
Ice hockey people from Toronto
Toronto Marlies players
Vienna Capitals players
Undrafted National Hockey League players
Canadian expatriate ice hockey players in Northern Ireland
Canadian expatriate ice hockey players in the United States
Canadian expatriate ice hockey players in Austria